The following is a list of episodes of Weird Science, a 1994-1997 American television sitcom on USA Network, based on the 1985 movie of the same name. Six previously unaired season-five episodes premiered in 1998 on Syfy.

Series overview

Episodes

Season 1 (1994)

Season 2 (1994)

Season 3 (1995)

Season 4 (1996)

Season 5 (1997–98)
Six episodes that did not air during the series' original run eventually aired on Syfy. The first two premiered July 11, 1998, with the remainder premiering as pairs of episodes July 18 and 25, 1998.

References

External links
 
 

Lists of American science fiction television series episodes
Lists of American sitcom episodes
Lists of American teen comedy television series episodes